The 2016 Corpus Christi mayoral election was held on November 8, 2016 to elect the mayor of Corpus Christi, Texas. It saw the election of Dan McQueen, who unseated incumbent mayor Nelda Martinez.

Results

References 

Corpus Christi
Corpus Christi
Mayoral elections in Corpus Christi, Texas
Non-partisan elections